The giant weaver (Ploceus grandis) is a species of bird in the family Ploceidae. It is endemic to São Tomé Island. It can climb trees and branches, rather like a treecreeper or sittella. Its natural habitat is subtropical or tropical moist lowland forests.

References

External links
 Giant weaver -  Species text in Weaver Watch.

giant weaver
Endemic fauna of São Tomé Island
Endemic birds of São Tomé and Príncipe
giant weaver
giant weaver
Taxonomy articles created by Polbot